Divjak is a village in the municipality of Vitez, Bosnia and Herzegovina.

Demographics 
According to the 2013 census, its population was 1,369.

References

Villages in the Federation of Bosnia and Herzegovina
Populated places in Vitez